Helmut Hallmeier (1933 – 26 June 1976) was a former Grand Prix motorcycle road racer from the Germany. His best years were in 1954 when he finished the season in ninth place in the 250cc world championship and 1957 when he finished in ninth place in the 350cc world championship.

References 

1933 births
1976 deaths
German motorcycle racers
250cc World Championship riders
350cc World Championship riders
Place of birth missing